Football clubs in the former Netherlands Antilles include:

C.S.D. Barber   (CUR)
UNDEBA (CUR)
SV Juventus (BON)
Real Rincon (BON)

Netherlands Antilles